Megafreya is a genus of spiders in the family Salticidae. It was first described in 2015 by Edwards. , it contains only one species, Megafreya sutrix, found in Paraguay, Uruguay, Argentina and Brazil and introduced to Java.

References

Salticidae
Monotypic Salticidae genera
Spiders of Asia
Spiders of South America